Surviving Escobar: Alias JJ (Spanish: Sobreviviendo a Escobar, Alias JJ) is a Colombian crime drama television series produced by Asier Aguilar, based on the book Sobreviviendo a Pablo Escobar by Jhon Jairo Velásquez, the lieutenant and right hand of Pablo Escobar, and stars Juan Pablo Urrego as the titular character. The series premiered in Colombia on Caracol Televisión on 8 February 2017 as Alias J.J., lo que pasa tras las rejas, and concluded on 23 May 2017. On Netflix the series premiered on 1 August 2017 with a total of sixty episodes.

The first episode of the series debuted with a total of 8.4 million viewers in Colombia, becoming the most watched production at 10:00pm, and surpassing El Comandante of RCN Televisión. Due to its good acceptance by the Colombian audience, the series was extended to 69 episodes, of the 60 that had already been sold internationally. The last episode aired on 23 May 2017, averaged a total of 9.8 million viewers, ranking third among the most viewed programs nationwide in Colombia.

Plot 
Sobreviviendo a Escobar recounts the life of Alias "JJ" after becoming the only survivor of the so-called "Extraditables". Everything begins in the decline of Pablo Escobar, when Alias "JJ" decides to surrender to justice. Already in prison he must face his enemies and use all his tactics not only to survive, but to establish again as a great capo inside the prison and continue his reign of terror, returning to be a feared drug trafficker from the prison.

Cast 
 Juan Pablo Urrego as Jhon Jairo Velásquez
 Amparo Grisales as Mónica Machado
 Nicole Santamaría as Alexandra Restrepo
 Elkin Díaz as Abel Mahecha
 Pacho Rueda as Pedro “El Potro”  Rentería
 Lina Marcela Castrillón as Victoria de Mahecha
 Toto Vega as Iván Darío Urrego Cuartas
 Ramsés Ramos as Comandante / Tulio Galeno
 Mario Bolaños as Carlos Castañeda
 Juan Felipe Muñoz as alias "Piojo"
 Frank Beltrán as Leonidas Caicedo alias "Zurcido"
 Adrián Jiménez as Duván 
 Victoria Hernández as Rosa Restrepo Jaramillo
 Ulices González as «gordo Robledo» 
 Salvador Puentes as alias "3H"
 Natasha Klauss as Ana María Solozábal

Special participation 
 Juan Pablo Franco as Pablo Emilio Escobar Gaviria
 Angélica Blandón as Lorenza Penagos
 Luis Mesa as Ignacio Molina
 Héctor Hernández as Gabriel Mendoza 
 Julio Sanchez Coccaro as Eduardo Bejarano

Episodes

References

External links 
 

Colombian drama television series
2017 Colombian television series debuts
2017 Colombian television series endings
Caracol Televisión original programming
2010s Colombian television series
Television shows set in Bogotá
Television shows set in Medellín
Television shows set in Cali
Spanish-language Netflix original programming
Works about Colombian drug cartels